The 2023 South Korean Figure Skating Championships was held from January 5–8, 2023 at the Uijeongbu Indoor Ice Rink in Uijeongbu. It was the 77th edition of the event. Medals were awarded in the disciplines of men's singles, women's singles, and ice dance on the senior and junior levels. The results were part of the Korean Skating Union's selection criteria for the 2023 World Junior Figure Skating Championships and the 2023 World Championships.

Due to the COVID-19 pandemic in South Korea, spectators followed social distancing and quarantine guidelines.

Schedule

Medal summary

Senior

Junior

Entries 
A list of preliminary entries was published on December 29, 2022.

Senior

Junior

Senior results

Senior men

Senior women

Senior pairs

Junior results

Junior men

Junior women

Junior ice dance

International team selections

Winter Universiade 
The 2023 Winter Universiade will be held in Lake Placid, United States from January 13–16, 2023.

Four Continents Championships 
The 2023 Four Continents Championships will be held in Colorado Springs, United States from February 7–12, 2023.

World Junior Championships 
Commonly referred to as "Junior Worlds", the 2023 World Junior Championships will be held in Calgary, Canada from February 27 – March 5, 2023.

World Championships 
The 2023 World Championships will be held in Saitama, Japan from March 20–26, 2023.

References

External links 
 

South Korean Figure Skating Championships
South Korean Figure Skating Championships, 2023
Figure skating
January 2023 sports events in South Korea